Dead Creek flows into the South Branch Grass River near Cranberry Lake, New York.

References

Rivers of St. Lawrence County, New York